is a Japanese politician serving in the House of Representatives in the Diet (national legislature) as a member of the Liberal Democratic Party. A native of Tokyo and graduate of the University of Tokyo he joined the Ministry of Finance in 1991. He graduated from Cornell Law School in the United States while still in the ministry. In 2005 he left the ministry and was elected to the Diet for the first time. In 2019 he was elected governor of the Yamanashi Prefecture with 49.7% votes in a single round.

References

External links 
  in Japanese.

1968 births
Living people
People from Tokyo
University of Tokyo alumni
Cornell Law School alumni
Koizumi Children
Members of the House of Representatives (Japan)
Liberal Democratic Party (Japan) politicians